Percy Mackenzie Pratt (12 January 1874 – 20 July 1961) was a cricketer who played five matches of first-class cricket for Taranaki from 1895 to 1898.

His highest score was 85, in Taranaki's only first-class victory, against Hawke's Bay in March 1897. He and William Crawshaw (106) added 114 for the third wicket. He scored his runs "very rapidly" and hit 13 fours.

He continued to represent the region after Taranaki lost first-class status after the 1897-98 season. Against the Australians in 1909-10 he top-scored for Taranaki in a match that ended in a close draw. Four years later he opened for South Taranaki against the Australians and scored 89; the next-highest Taranaki scorer made 33. He represented South Taranaki in the Hawke Cup from 1911 to 1922.

Pratt ran a cabinet-making, upholstering and undertaking business in Hawera. He married Beatrice Annie King in Hawera in February 1902.

References

External links

1874 births
1961 deaths
People from Bareilly
Taranaki cricketers
Indian emigrants to New Zealand